Werner Franz (May 22, 1922 – August 13, 2014) was the cabin boy aboard the ill-fated LZ 129 Hindenburg which crashed on May 6, 1937. At the time of the crash he was only 14 years old. He was the last known surviving crew member of the Hindenburg as of his death in 2014. On the airship he was in charge of serving all of the ship's officers and crew. Later on in life he became an ice and roller skate coach. Some of his pupils include Olympic silver medalist Marika Kilius and her partner Franz Ningel.

Sources 
 
 

LZ 129 Hindenburg
1922 births
2014 deaths
Flight attendants
Speed skating coaches